Angelique van der Meet (born 20 February 1991) is a former professional Dutch tennis player.

Van der Meet won four singles and three doubles titles on the ITF Circuit in her career. On 5 August 2013, she reached her best singles ranking of world No. 228. On 24 June 2013, she peaked at No. 319 in the doubles rankings.

Van der Meet made her debut for the Netherlands Fed Cup team in February 2013, winning her doubles rubber with Bibiane Schoofs against Anne Kremer and Claudine Schaul of Luxembourg.

ITF finals

Singles: 11 (4–7)

Doubles: 5 (3–2)

Fed Cup participation

Doubles

References

External links
  
 
 
 

1991 births
Living people
Sportspeople from Borsele
Dutch female tennis players
21st-century Dutch women